Indego Africa is a nonprofit social enterprise that supports women in Rwanda through economic empowerment and education. Founded in 2007, Indego Africa partners with female artisans in Rwanda and sells their handcrafted products, pooling the profits, along with grants and donations, to fund education programs in business management, entrepreneurship, literacy, and technology. On October 1, 2014, Indego Africa launched a Leadership Academy in Kigali, Rwanda to provide advanced business education programs.

History
Indego Africa was founded in 2007 by father and son Matt and Tom Mitro. In mid-2007, Indego Africa began a partnership with a cooperative of 30 female artisans in Kigali called Cocoki. In 2014, Indego Africa was partnering with over 600 women across 18 cooperatives, selling their products through its website, boutiques worldwide, and collaborations with major designers and brands including Anthropologie, DANNIJO, J Crew, Jonathan Adler, Madewell, and P.S.- I made this...

Social impact
Indego Africa's reports to date show steady improvements in its partners' income, educational outcomes, entrepreneurial activities, and quality of life. As of 2013, 69% of its artisan partners made over $1.50 a day vs. 3% in 2010; 89% reported that Indego Africa trainings helped them run their cooperatives or other businesses; 54% participated in a business outside their cooperative; 77% could afford to send all of their children to school; and 90% could afford healthcare.

References

Charities based in New York (state)
Peer-to-peer charities
Organizations established in 2007
Foreign charities operating in Rwanda